Oldham Brewery Ltd was an English brewery based in Oldham Lancashire. It was founded in 1868.

History 
The Brewery (Albion Brewery, Coldhurst Street, Oldham) was built close to the town centre by the Stott family of architects.

Beers 
The company brewed and sold OB branded beers:
 OB Bitter
 OB Mild
 OB Pale Ale
OB Old Gold
OB Brown Ale
OB Oldham Stout
OB Old Tom
 Kaltenberg Lager
 Rhinegold Lager

There were numerous OB tied public houses in and around the Oldham area.

Later history 
The brewery was sold to Boddington's in 1982 and brewing in Oldham stopped soon afterwards. Boddingtons itself was sold to Whitbread in the 1990s and the OB Brand disappeared from sale.

More recently, Robinson's Brewery bought the brand in 2006 and OB Bitter can be found on sale in some Robinson's pubs, and as a guest beer in some others.

Companies based in Oldham
Breweries in England  
1868 establishments in England
British companies established in 1868 
Food and drink companies established in 1868